Anping Creek or the An-ping River is a creek in Liaoning Province, China.

It is a tributary of the Yalu River whose mouth is located at Gulouzi Township.

It formed part of the boundary between Russian-occupied Chinese Manchuria and Japanese Manchuria, as set forth in the Treaty of Shimonoseki in AD 1895.

References

Rivers of Liaoning